Reginald McKee (born 1900, date of death unknown) was an English footballer active in the 1920s. He made a total of 40 appearances in The Football League for Gillingham and Charlton Athletic.

References

1900 births
English Football League players
Erith & Belvedere F.C. players
Gillingham F.C. players
Charlton Athletic F.C. players
Dartford F.C. players
English footballers
Date of death missing
Association footballers not categorized by position